Solos en la madrugada is a 1978 Spanish film written and directed by José Luis Garci, starring José Sacristán and Fiorella Faltoyano. The film built on the success of Garci's previous and successful film Asignatura pendiente, but did not have the same results.<ref name = "Torres 433">Torres,  Diccionario del cine Español,  p. 433</ref>

 Plot 
José Miguel García, a thirty-seven years old radio announcer, has achieved professional success with his late-night radio show Solos en la madrugada (Alone in the morning) which is devoted to criticizing the government of caudillo Francisco Franco. The program has achieved the highest audience in the country. The space, full of irony, is directed to those men and women born during the Spanish civil war or in the years immediately after, whom he accuses of cowardice and failing in a life burdened by the past.

The journalist pessimistic point of views are a reflection of the dissatisfaction he faces in his own life. José Miguel is separated from his wife, Elena, with whom he has two children, whom he rarely sees. During this period of his life comes the opportunity to begin a new life with a girl named Maite, who belongs to a generation of war and the postwar period.

 Cast 
 José Sacristán - José Miguel García Carande
 Fiorella Faltoyano - Elena
 Emma Cohen - Maite
 María Casanova - Lola

DVD releaseSolos en la madrugada is available in Region 2 DVD in Spanish only. It was released on DVD in 2009.

 References 
 Torres, Augusto, Diccionario del cine Español'', Espasa Calpe, 1996,

Notes

External links 
 

Spanish drama films
1970s Spanish-language films
1978 films
Films with screenplays by José Luis Garci
Films directed by José Luis Garci
Films about the Spanish Transition